The Simalur rat (Rattus simalurensis) is a species of rodent in the family Muridae.
It is found only in Indonesia, on Simalur island and the nearby islands of Siumat, Lasia, and Babi

References

Rattus
Mammals described in 1903
Taxonomy articles created by Polbot